Rosana Vinueza Estrada de Tama (6 February 1949 – 25 August 2009) was an Ecuadorian beauty queen and politician. In 1969, she was named Miss Ecuador 1969, and was a participant in Miss Universe 1969. From there, she married and had four children, and went to work in the nonprofit sector. She was the manager of Fundación Natura, an environmental non-profit organization, and also guided Fundación Crecer as that non-profit organization was starting up.

Vinueza first became involved in politica in 1988, when she became a councillor of her hometown of Guayaquil. During Sixto Durán-Ballén's presidency in 1994, she was named Undersecretary of Social Welfare, remaining in that position through 1996. That year, she was nominated by Freddy Ehlers to be his Vice President during his 1996 presidential run. The move was considered controversial by supporters on both the left and right wings of Ecuadorian politics, due to her environmentalism and her support of Opus Dei, respectively; the ticket finished third with 21% of the vote.

After the failed presidential run, Vinueza was named Undersecretary of Tourism during Gustavo Noboa's presidency, serving from 2000 to 2003, then became Vice President of the Civic Board of Guayaquil in 2008. In 1999, Vinueza was diagnosed with cancer, which led to her death a decade later at the age of 60.

External links

Official Miss Ecuador website

References

1949 births
2009 deaths
Miss Universe 1969 contestants
Ecuadorian beauty pageant winners
People from Guayaquil
Ecuadorian women in politics
Beauty queen-politicians